Ustinov College is the largest college of Durham University, located in Durham, North East England. Founded as the Graduate Society in 1965, it became a college in 2003 and was named after then-chancellor, Sir Peter Ustinov. Formerly at the Howlands Farm site at the top of Elvet Hill, in 2017 the college relocated to the Sheraton Park site in Neville's Cross.

History

In 1965, William Bayne Fisher, a professor in Durham University's geography department, founded the Graduate Society and in its inaugural year, the total membership was 94 students: 86 men and 8 women. As more than 50% of its members lived in private accommodation, it retained its status as a society for over 35 years. In this time, the society acquired more accommodation: the Parsons field site off Old Elvet consisted of Fisher House, the Parsons Field House, Fonteyn Court and the Parsons Field Court; Palatine House; Kepier House and Kepier Court, both at the top of Claypath; 29, 34 and 38 on Old Elvet and Shincliffe Hall in Shincliffe Village.

The society's accommodation has since then been gradually consolidated with the building of new accommodation at Howlands Farm in 1998, and on Dryburn Road in 2005. Since 1965, membership had increased to over 1500 and in 2003, the society was turned into a college and named in honour of the Chancellor of the University (1992–2004), Sir Peter Ustinov. The college's offices were moved from Old Elvet to the Howlands Farm site in September 2005. The college motto (Diversitate Valemus) was coined later that year by Zu'bi Al-Zu'bi, President of the GCR.

The Parson's Field site at the end of Old Elvet, which had been the heart of the community during its years as the Graduate Society, was handed over to St Cuthbert's Society in 2005 and Palatine house was transferred to Hatfield College in 2006.

In 2017, Ustinov College moved from Howlands Farm to Sheraton Park, originally built for Neville's Cross College in 1921 and vacated in 2004.

Membership
While Durham's other colleges accept postgraduates, Ustinov College admits them exclusively, and is less formal in its structure than the other colleges. There are reported to be over 100 nationalities represented in Ustinov College, including members from Thailand, Greece, the United States, Jordan and Nigeria.

Graduate Common Room
The Graduate Common Room (GCR) is the student community of Ustinov College and all student members of the college, whether living in or out, are eligible for membership. Historically, the postgraduate community (through its elected representatives, the House Committee) had a high degree of autonomy from college officers and was self-governing in many matters. Today, the GCR committee, made up of elected house representatives officers, represent students' views in meetings with the college officers. The GCR committee also organises many student social events such as regular formal dinners, parties, the annual Summer Ball and Ustinov Summer Barbecue. As well as this, the GCR oversees many clubs and societies within the college, and manages the college bar at Howlands Farm. The first college formal was held in late 2006.

Academic community

Ustinov College is home to an academic community which enables students from departments across the university to engage each other in interdisciplinary dialogue.  Current projects in Ustinov's academic community are the Cafe des Arts, Cafe Politique, Cafe Scientifique, Ustinov Seminar, and the Ustinov Intercultural Forum (UIF). In addition to this, a college scholarship is awarded in support of the Race, Crime and Justice Research Group, which connects academics from across the north east of England.

References

Other sources
 BBC News: College Honour for Ustinov BBC News Article on renaming of the Graduate Society.
 "Sir Peter Ustinov in his own College", University of Durham. Some history in the footnotes

External links
 Ustinov College The official college website
 Ustinov GCR The Graduate Common Room website

Colleges of Durham University
Educational institutions established in 1965
1965 establishments in England